The Trade with France Act 1688 (1 Will. & Mar. c. 34) was an Act passed by the Parliament of England which prohibited all trade and commerce with France, effective 24 August 1689 and in force for three years. Passage had followed the accession of William III and Mary II, and after their declaration of war against France on 17 May 1689 (O.S.). The act expired in 1692 with the Nine Years' War still raging, and it was renewed by the Trade with France Act 1692 (4 Will. & Mar. c. 25) for a further three years.

Notes

1688 in law
Acts of the Parliament of England
1688 in England
Protectionism